Evan Fowler (born July 7, 1995) is an American professional soccer player.

Career
On July 12, 2013 it was announced that Fowler, along with Vaughn Fowler, were promoted to the Richmond Kickers first-team, becoming the very first Academy graduates to make it to the first-team.

Career statistics

References

External links 
USL profile

1995 births
Living people
American soccer players
Richmond Kickers players
Association football midfielders
USL Championship players
Soccer players from Richmond, Virginia